Captain John Buxton Pelham, 8th Earl of Chichester (12 June 1912 – 21 February 1944), styled The Honourable John Pelham until 1926, was a British diplomat.

Pelham was the younger son of Jocelyn Pelham, 6th Earl of Chichester, and Ruth Buxton, daughter of Francis Buxton. He was educated at Eton College and Trinity College, Oxford.

He succeeded in the earldom at age fourteen in 1926 on the early death of his elder brother. A diplomat in the 1930s, he served as Honorary Attaché to Warsaw in 1931 and Washington in 1933, as Honorary Private Secretary to British High Commissioner to Canada from December 1933 to July 1934, and as 3rd Secretary and Press Attaché at The Hague in 1939. He fought in the Second World War, gaining the rank of Captain in the Scots Guards. He died on 21 February 1944 at age 31, killed in a road accident, while on active service.  He was buried in the churchyard of Stanmer Church, Sussex.

They had one daughter and a son, John Pelham, 9th Earl of Chichester, who was born after his father's death in April 1944. The Countess of Chichester married as her second husband Ralph Gunning Henderson, in 1957. They were divorced in 1971. Lady Chichester died in 1989.

References

External links

1912 births
1944 deaths
Burials in Sussex
People educated at Eton College
Earls of Chichester
John
Scots Guards officers
Road incident deaths in the United Kingdom
Pelham
20th-century English nobility